Goodwill Industries International Inc., often shortened in speech and writing to Goodwill (stylized as goodwill), is an American nonprofit 501(c)(3) organization that provides job training, employment placement services, and other community-based programs for people who have barriers to their employment. Goodwill Industries also hires veterans and individuals who lack either education, job experience or face employment challenges. The nonprofit is funded by a network of 3,200+ retail thrift stores which operate as independent nonprofits as well. 

Goodwill Industries operates as a network of independent, community-based organizations in South Korea, Venezuela, Brazil, Mexico, Panama, Uruguay, the United States, Canada, and eight other countries, with 165 local Goodwill retail stores in the United States and Canada. It slowly expanded from its founding in 1902 and was first called Goodwill in 1915. 

In fiscal year 2018, Goodwill organizations generated a total of $6.1 billion in revenue, of which $5.27 billion was spent on charitable services, and $646 million was spent on salaries and other operating expenses. Services constituted 89 percent of expenses.  In 2015, the group served more than 37 million people, with more than 312,000 people placed into employment.

Goodwill Industries' logo is a stylized letter g, resembling a smiling face. It was designed by Joseph Selame in 1968.

History

In 1902, the Reverend Edgar J. Helms of Morgan Methodist Chapel in Boston started Goodwill as part of his ministry. Helms and his congregation collected used household goods and clothing being discarded in wealthier areas of the city, then trained and hired the unemployed or impoverished to mend and repair them. The products were then redistributed to those in need or were given to the needy people who helped repair them. 

In 1915, Helms hosted a visit to Morgan Memorial by representatives of a workshop mission in Brooklyn, NY so they could learn the innovative programs and operating techniques of the "Morgan Memorial Cooperative Industries and Stores, Inc." Helms was subsequently invited to visit New York. Out of these exchanges came Brooklyn's willingness to adopt and adapt the Morgan Memorial's way of doing things, while Helms was persuaded Brooklyn's name for its workshop, "Goodwill Industries", was preferable to the Morgan Memorial name. Thus was officially born Morgan Memorial Goodwill Industries, plus Brooklyn's interest and ties, this became the foundation on which Goodwill Industries was to be built as an international movement.

Goodwill has become an international nonprofit organization that, as of 2016, takes in more than $4.8 billion in annual revenue and provides more than 300,000 people with job training and community services each year.

Operations

Around the same year, Goodwill launched the first nonprofit Internet auction site in the United States. By 2006, Goodwill Industries International had a network of 207 member organizations in the United States, Canada, and 23 other countries. As of July 2011, there are 164 full Goodwill members in the United States and Canada. These are each independent social enterprises that operate their own regional Goodwill retail stores and job training programs. Morgan Memorial Goodwill Industries, Boston, is the enterprise operated in Boston, where Goodwill was founded.

The clothing and household goods donated to Goodwill are sold in more than 3,200 Goodwill retail stores, on its Internet auction site shopgoodwill.com, and eBay by a number of its regional stores. Most of the items on www.shopgoodwill.com are either considered collectible or more valuable than their auction price, and bidding can be fierce. Each regional store lists on the site what they believe will sell at an initial auction or buy it now price, so the items are purchased for fair market value. Antiques, collectibles ranging from baskets to books, jewelry, comic books, furniture, small electronics, appliances and even automobiles are listed. 

The revenues fund job training and other services to prepare people for job success. Examples of Goodwill's presence on eBay are Goodwill Industries of Maine, Seattle, San Francisco, and many other locations. Goodwill locations that operate on eBay research donated items for higher profit than could be brought in-store, and instead list those items on eBay for auction. 

In 2010, through their involvement in Goodwill's programs, more than 170,000 people were placed into employment. They earned $2.7 billion in salaries and wages, and as tax-paying citizens, they contributed to the community. This amounts to an average annual earning of less than $16,000. Goodwill also generates income to help businesses and the federal government fill gaps caused by labor shortages, time constraints, and limited space or equipment. Local Goodwill branches train and employ contract workers to fill outsourced needs for document management, assembly, mailing, custodial work, grounds keeping and more. Goodwill claims that more than 84 percent of its total revenue is used to fund education and career services and other critical community programs. Also in 2010, Goodwill provided people with training careers in industries such as banking, IT and health care, as well as offering English-language training, education, transportation, and child care services.

When merchandise cannot be sold at a normal Goodwill store, it is taken to a "Goodwill Outlet" or "Bargain Store" where items are mostly sold by weight, with prices ranging from $0.49 to $1.89 per pound, depending on the location. The wide selection and massive discounts on a variety of household goods typically attract a fervent following of regular customers, some of whom make a full-time living buying and re-selling goods. There are also many vendors who buy this merchandise in bulk, and they send the merchandise to third-world countries.

Charity Watch rates the Goodwill Industries an "A".

In January 2016, Goodwill Industries of Toronto, Eastern, Central and Northern Ontario closed its 16 stores and 10 donation centres after 80 years of operations, citing cash problems. The six other Canadian Goodwill Industries Branches remain operational.

In 2019, Goodwill Industries of Northern Michigan announced that it is receiving a $1.25 million grant fund from the Amazon CEO's Day One Families Fund.

In May 2022, Goodwill Industries International’s announced a $14 million investment in their Digital Career Accelerator. The donation made by Google.org of $7 million in direct grants and $7 million in search ads on Google aims to reach more than 2,000,000 people across the U.S and Canada though infrastructure expansion to aid the development of digital skills and career training.

Helms College and Edgar's Hospitality Group 
In 2021, Mackenzie Scott, ex-wife of Amazon CEO Jeff Bezos, donated $10 million to Goodwill Industries of Middle Georgia (GIMG) -- the only Goodwill that includes an accredited vocational college: Helms College. President Dr. David Pugh leads Helms College and academic programming for certificates, diplomas and degrees in culinary arts, industrial trades, and medical services; and uses the restaurants within Edgar's Hospitality Group as applied learning venues for its culinary students. It is named after Edgar Helms, founder of Goodwill. GIMG is the only Goodwill in the world operating a college and hospitality venues to serve the mission.

GIMG also dealt with former CFO Tim Ligon stealing $75,000 from the organization.

Castro pop-up
In November 2010, for the first time, Goodwill opened a store in San Francisco, California, specifically designed to hire employees who are transgender, gay, or lesbian. The temporary or "Pop-up" store was a unique partnership between Goodwill of San Francisco and Transgender Economic Empowerment Initiative. The Castro Pop-up store closed in April 2011, and staff were transferred to various Goodwill stores throughout the San Francisco area.

POP! at South by Southwest
Goodwill Industries International and Goodwill Industries of Central Texas (Austin) hosted their first "pop-up" retail shop, POP!, at South by Southwest in 2013.

Donate Movement
In 2010, Goodwill launched the Donate Movement to demonstrate the value that donated goods have for people and the planet. Goodwill's vision for the Donate icon is a universal reminder to 'recycle' through responsible donation, helping provide opportunities for others while diverting usable items from landfills.

21st-Century Initiative
On the occasion of its 100th anniversary in 2002, Goodwill Industries launched an international workforce development initiative designed to integrate 20 million people into the workplace by the year 2020.

Known as the Goodwill Industries 21st Century Initiative, the plan includes broad strategies for getting people into good jobs that enable them to become self-sufficient. These strategies include providing job and technology training for a 21st-century workforce, offering family strengthening services to support workers and their families, and developing business opportunities to employ individuals who were previously considered unemployable.

Women Veterans initiative
As part of the Joining Forces campaign of First Ladies, Michelle Obama and Jill Biden, Goodwill has hired nearly 1,800 veterans and military family members and served nearly 100,000 more with job training and placement services.

In June 2013, Goodwill announced an initiative with the goal of engaging 3,000 women veterans over the next two years with services and support that lead to economic self-sufficiency.

GoodProspects
GoodProspects is an online program of Goodwill where people exploring career options can get advice from people who have worked in the field in which they are interested. Career mentors advising users are online volunteers. GoodProspects was launched in the Fall of 2011, funded by a grant from the U.S. Department of Labor Employment and Training Administration. It is currently supported by Accenture and SafeLink Wireless.

Donation policies

Goodwill has policies on donations, including items that it can accept. It will only accept items that can be resold, whether in the retail stores, on-line, or as bulk lots.

Goodwill stores generally do not accept donations such as automotive parts, furniture showing signs of damage, large appliances including stoves, refrigerators, washers/dryers, or exercise equipment. Most stores also do not accept hazardous materials such as paint, medications, or building materials such as doors, wood, nails, etc. For liability reasons, Goodwill generally does not accept baby cribs or car seats. Sanitary regulations prohibit accepting mattress donations, and although some Goodwill stores sell brand new mattresses, most locations are unable. Recently, because of safety concerns, particularly lead content in painted products, some Goodwill stores do not accept certain toys.

Goodwill will generally accept donations of clothing, shoes, books, accessories (handbags, belts), dishes, furniture in good condition, household decorations, small appliances including vacuum cleaners, and consumer electronics including alarm clocks. Even if they are deemed unfit to be sold in a store, these items can be sold as bulk lots, and so they can still generate income.

Depending on local laws, the value of the goods donated can be used as a tax deduction.

Almost all Goodwill locations closed during state-wide mandates at the beginning of the COVID-19 pandemic and have now reopened. However, the donation policies of individual locations have changed. Many locations are now only accepting donations on selected days in order to keep up with the surplus of supplies they are receiving and to get a chance to properly sanitize the stores.

Criticism and compensation

Executive compensation
In 2005, Goodwill Industries of the Columbia Willamette (GICW), Goodwill's Portland, Oregon, branch, came under scrutiny due to executive compensation that the Oregon attorney general's office concluded was "unreasonable". The President of the Portland branch, Michael Miller, received $838,508 in pay and benefits for fiscal year 2004, which was reportedly out of line in comparison to other charity executives and placed him in the top one percent of American wage earners. After being confronted with the state's findings, Miller agreed to a 24% reduction in pay, and GICW formed a new committee and policy for handling matters of employee compensation.

A 2013 article on Watchdog.org reported that Goodwill's tax returns showed that more than 100 Goodwills pay less than minimum wage while simultaneously paying more than $53.7 million in total compensation to top executives. Douglas Barr, former CEO of the Goodwill of Southern California, was the highest paid Goodwill executive in the country. He received total compensation worth $1,188,733, including a base salary of $350,200, bonuses worth $87,550, retirement benefits of $71,050, and $637,864 in deferred compensation, after serving as CEO for 17 years. This is often incorrectly cited as his salary "In 2011, the Columbia Willamette Goodwill, one of the largest in the country, says it paid $922,444 in commensurate wages to approximately 250 people with developmental disabilities. These employees worked 159,584 hours for an average hourly wage of $5.78. The lowest paid worker received just $1.40 per hour."

In 2018, CEO Rich Cantz of Goodwill Northern New England (NNE) put out a video statement addressing the false "Think Before You Donate" rumors that alleged owner Mark Curran profits $2.3 million a year from the organization, and no money was going to charity. In the statement, he says that Goodwill NNE does, in fact, give to charities and works to provide resources for brain injury rehabilitation centers, those with disabilities, and veterans seeking work. Further, the website states that "Mark Curran" is neither the owner nor CEO. As of 2020, Steven Preston is the CEO of Goodwill Industries International and has to report to a volunteer board of directors. In 2020, the stores in New England were still running a voiceover during shopping hours that reiterated this message to shoppers. The claims appeared in a longer email covering several for-profit and non-profit organizations, which was also debunked by Snopes.

Workers' wages

Goodwill Industries International has been criticized by some for using a provision of federal labor law to pay workers with disabilities less than the federal minimum wage. Under Section 14(c) of the Fair Labor Standards Act of 1938, organizations can obtain a "special wage certificate" to pay workers with disabilities a commensurate wage based on performance evaluations. Of Goodwill's 105,000 employees, 7,300 are paid under the special wage certificate program. The National Federation of the Blind considers it "unfair, discriminatory, and immoral". Other disability rights advocates have defended Goodwill's use of the special wage certificate to employ workers with disabilities. Terry Farmer, CEO of ACCSES, a trade group that calls itself the "voice of disability service providers", said scrapping the provision could "force [disabled workers] to stay at home", enter rehabilitation, "or otherwise engage in unproductive and unsatisfactory activities". Goodwill believes that the policy is "a tool to create employment for people with disabilities" who would not otherwise be employed. Goodwill notes that "Eliminating it would remove an important tool for employers and an employment option available to people with severe disabilities and their families. Without the law, many people with disabilities could lose their jobs." Goodwill has urged Congress to "support legislation that would strengthen the FLSA and increase its enforcement", and to "preserve opportunities for people with disabilities who would otherwise lose the chance to realize the many tangible and intangible benefits of work.". A 2013 FLSA fact sheet from Goodwill states that "Without FLSA Section 14(c), many more people with severe disabilities would experience difficulty in participating in the workforce. These jobs provide individuals with paychecks that they would be unlikely to receive otherwise, as well as ongoing services and support, job security, and the opportunity for career advancement."

Lobbying
A coalition of smaller charities in California had complained about Goodwill's support for legislation encouraging greater regulation of donation boxes, calling the efforts an "attempt to corner the clothing donation market and make more money". Local Goodwills have argued that donation boxes divert money from the community and contribute to blight, and have pushed for state legislation that requires owners of a donation box to clearly display information about whether it is a for-profit or nonprofit organization.

References

External links

 

1902 establishments in Massachusetts
Charities based in Massachusetts
Disability organizations based in the United States
International charities
Organizations established in 1902
Retail companies established in 1902
Retail companies of the United States
Social welfare charities based in the United States